Pretty Boy may refer to:

People
 Pretty Boy Floyd (1904–1934), American gangster and bank robber
 Don Covay (1936–2015), American singer
 Larry Hennig (1936–2018), American professional wrestler
 Floyd Mayweather Jr. (born 1977), American boxer
 Doug Somers (1951–2017), American professional wrestler

Songs
 "Pretty Boy", by 2NE1 from 2NE1, 2009
 "Pretty Boy", by Danity Kane from Welcome to the Dollhouse, 2008
 "Pretty Boy", by Edurne, 2013
 "Pretty Boy", by Erreway from Señales, 2003
 "Pretty Boy", by Janet Jackson from Dream Street, 1984
 "Pretty Boy", by Joji from Nectar, 2020
 "Pretty Boy", by Juniel, 2013
 "Pretty Boy", by M2M from Shades of Purple, 2000
 "Pretty Boy", by Noel Gallagher's High Flying Birds from Council Skies, 2023 (released as a single in 2022)
 "Pretty Boy", by S Club 8 from Sundown, 2003
 "Pretty Boy", by Young Galaxy from Ultramarine, 2013

Other uses
 Pretty Boy (comics), a Marvel Comics character
 "Pretty Boy" (short story), a 2006 Ender's Game story by Orson Scott Card
 Prettyboy Reservoir, Baltimore County, Maryland, US
 Pretty Man, or Pretty Boy, a South Korean romantic comedy television series

See also
 
 
 Prettyman (disambiguation)
 Pretty Girl (disambiguation)